The 1957 U.S. Open was the 57th U.S. Open, held June 12–15 at Inverness Club in Toledo, Ohio. Dick Mayer defeated defending champion Cary Middlecoff in an 18-hole playoff to win his only major title.

Amateur Billy Joe Patton was the 36-hole co-leader with Mayer, but fell back with consecutive 76s and tied for eighth. The 54-hole lead was held by Jimmy Demaret, age 47, attempting to become the oldest U.S. Open champion. Mayer was a shot back, while Middlecoff, Julius Boros, and Roberto De Vicenzo were two back.

With temperatures soaring in the final round with high humidity, Demaret was five-over through eleven holes. He rebounded with three birdies on the back nine to post a 72 and a 283 total, a shot out of the playoff. Mayer carded a 70 and a 282 total, while Middlecoff birdied the last to force a playoff. The Sunday playoff turned out to be a one-sided affair, as Mayer shot 72 to Middlecoff's 79. Temperatures again approached  and only one birdie was carded.

This U.S. Open witnessed the debut of 17-year-old amateur Jack Nicklaus, who had consecutive rounds of 80 and missed the cut.
It was just the beginning for Nicklaus, as he won a record-tying four U.S. Open titles and a record 18 major championships. While Nicklaus was making his debut, three-time major winner Denny Shute was playing his last Open; he too missed the cut. Two-time champion Gene Sarazen, at 55 in his penultimate Open, also missed the cut. After receiving medical attention for a back ailment, four-time champion and pre-tournament favorite Ben Hogan withdrew prior to his first round on Thursday.

This was the third U.S. Open at Inverness, which hosted in 1920 and 1931. The U.S. Open returned in 1979 and the PGA Championship followed in 1986 and 1993.

Course layout 

Source:

Lengths of the course for previous major championships:

Past champions in the field

Made the cut

Missed the cut 

Source:

 Due to a back ailment, four-time champion Ben Hogan formally withdrewfrom the championship on Thursday morning without playing.

Round summaries

First round
Thursday, June 13, 1957

Source:

Second round
Friday, June 14, 1957

Source:

Third round
Saturday, June 15, 1957 (morning)

Source:

Final round
Saturday, June 15, 1957 (afternoon)

Source:
(a) denotes amateur

Playoff 
Sunday, June 16, 1957

Scorecard 

Cumulative playoff scores, relative to par
{|class="wikitable" span = 50 style="font-size:85%;
|-
|style="background: Pink;" width=10|
|Birdie
|style="background: PaleGreen;" width=10|
|Bogey
|style="background: Green;" width=10|
|Double bogey
|}
Source:

References

External links
USGA Championship Database

U.S. Open (golf)
Golf in Ohio
Sports competitions in Ohio
Sports in Toledo, Ohio
U.S. Open
U.S. Open
U.S. Open
U.S. Open